Etchohuaquila is a small town within the municipality of Navojoa, in the Mexican state of Sonora.  . It is known for being the birthplace and hometown of former Major League Baseball pitcher Fernando Valenzuela.

References

Populated places in Sonora